John William Wilson, PC, JP (22 October 1858 – 18 June 1932) was a British chemical manufacturer and politician who served for 27 years as a member of parliament (MP), initially as Liberal Unionist and then as a Liberal.

Background
Wilson was the eldest son of John Edward Wilson of Wyddrington, Edgbaston and Catherine Stacey of Tottenham. He was educated at Grove House School, Tottenham and in Germany. In 1883 he married Florence Jane Harrison who died in 1911. In 1919 he married Isabel Bannatyne. He served as a Justice of the peace in Worcestershire and Herefordshire. He worked for the chemical manufacturers Albright and Wilson Limited of Oldbury. He became a director of the Great Western Railway Company and of Bryant and May Limited.

Political career
Wilson was elected to Worcestershire County Council, representing the Langley division. He was elected at the 1895 general election as Liberal Unionist MP for the Northern division of Worcestershire against a Liberal opponent. He was re-elected unopposed at the 1900 general election. Some time between then and 1906 he left the Liberal Unionists and joined the Liberal Party, and although he enjoyed no further uncontested elections he was returned to the House of Commons as a Liberal in 1906 and in both the January 1910 and December 1910 elections. He was made a Privy Councillor in July 1911.

When constituencies were revised for the 1918 general election, Wilson was elected for the newly created Stourbridge division of Worcestershire. He had been opposed by candidates of both the Labour Party and the National Democratic and Labour Party, the latter holding a "coalition coupon", and he won with only 38.5% of the votes. In 1922 he faced only a Conservative opponent, Douglas Pielou, who won the seat. Wilson did not stand for Parliament again.

Electoral record

References

External links 

1858 births
1932 deaths
Liberal Unionist Party MPs for English constituencies
Liberal Party (UK) MPs for English constituencies
UK MPs 1895–1900
UK MPs 1900–1906
UK MPs 1906–1910
UK MPs 1910
UK MPs 1910–1918
UK MPs 1918–1922
Members of the Privy Council of the United Kingdom